Lionel Arthur Louch (4 July 1888 – 1 February 1967) was an English amateur footballer who played as a center-forward for Portsmouth, Brentford and England Amateurs. He was a member of Great Britain's squad for the football tournament at the 1908 Summer Olympics, but he did not play in any matches.

Club career 
Born in London, Louch in the Football League for hometown clubs Queens Park Rangers and Shepherd's Bush before moving to the South coast and joining Portsmouth. At the start of the next season, Louch moved out of the Southern League and joined Clapton Orient, making his Football League début against Barnsley in the second division on the Christmas Day of 1908. He spent two seasons at Orient scoring 10 goals in 38 League and Cup games. Louch then played for Brentford and Southend United before the outbreak of the war when he joined the London Regiment but was pensioned out after just less than one year service.

International career 
In 1908, Louch made his debut for England Amateurs against Sweden on 8 September 1908, scoring in a 6-1 win. He was then part of the English amateur team that represented Great Britain at the Olympic football tournament, but he failed to play in any matches as the side won gold. He was a member of the  After a 6-year hiatus, he played another game for the team on 7 February 1914 against Wales, netting four goals in a 9–1 victory, and later that month, he scored a hat-trick in a 7–0 win over Belgium.

International goals
England Amateurs score listed first, score column indicates score after each Louch goal.

References

1888 births
1967 deaths
Footballers from Hanwell
English footballers
England amateur international footballers
Association football forwards
Queen's Park F.C. players
Portsmouth F.C. players
Leyton Orient F.C. players
English Football League players
British Army personnel of World War I